Hubert "Hub" Macey (April 13, 1921 – May 27, 2008) was a Canadian professional ice hockey forward who played 30 games in the National Hockey League for the Montreal Canadiens and New York Rangers. He was born in Big River, Saskatchewan.

External links

1921 births
2008 deaths
Buffalo Bisons (AHL) players
Canadian ice hockey forwards
Houston Huskies players
Houston Skippers players
Ice hockey people from Saskatchewan
Montreal Canadiens players
New York Rangers players
Springfield Indians players
Tulsa Oilers (USHL) players
New York Rovers players
Canadian expatriate ice hockey players in the United States